Yury Sokolov (born 11 May 1929) is a Russian boxer. He competed in the men's featherweight event at the 1952 Summer Olympics.

References

1929 births
Living people
Russian male boxers
Olympic boxers of the Soviet Union
Boxers at the 1952 Summer Olympics
Sportspeople from Ivanovo
Featherweight boxers